William Clark (1770–1838) was an American soldier and explorer; governor of Missouri Territory.

William Clark may also refer to:

Business
 W. H. Clark (brewer) (William Henry Clark, c. 1815–c. 1870), brewer in South Australia
 William Bell Clark (1889–1968), American advertising executive and naval historian
 William Clark (stockbroker), Australian financier and racehorse owner in London

Entertainment
 Bill Clark (screenwriter) (born 1944), former New York Police Department detective and television writer
 William Clark (artist) (1803–1883), Scottish marine painter
 William Andrews Clark Jr. (1877–1934), American violinist and founder of the Los Angeles Philharmonic
 Bill Clark (musician) (1925–1986), American jazz drummer
 Billy C. Clark (1928–2009), American author

Military
 William A. Clark (soldier) (1828–1916), American Civil War soldier and Medal of Honor recipient
 William Philo Clark (1845–1884), U.S. Army officer
 William Leon Clark (1911–2005), Deputy Chief of Chaplains of the U.S. Air Force

Politics

U.S.
 William Clark (merchant) (1670–1742), merchant and town official in Boston, Massachusetts
 William Clark (congressman) (1774–1851), US Congressman from Pennsylvania and U.S. Treasurer
 Billy J. Clark (1778–1866), American physician and politician from New York
 William Clark Jr. (1798–1871), American politician and signatory to the Texas Declaration of Independence
 William Clark Jr. (diplomat) (1930–2008), former United States Ambassador to India
 William Clark (Montgomery County, NY) (1811–1885), New York politician
 William A. Clark (1839–1925), copper baron and United States Senator from Montana
 William A. Clark (Maryland politician) (born 1958), American politician from Maryland
 William D. Clark (1916–1985), economist and first director of the Overseas Development Institute
 William G. Clark (1924–2001), American jurist and politician
 William G. Clark Jr. (1912–1990), American jurist and politician in Massachusetts
 William P. Clark Jr. (1931–2013), American politician, and United States Secretary of the Interior
 Ramsey Clark (William Ramsey Clark; 1927–2021), American politician, United States Attorney General
 William Thomas Clark (1831–1905), American soldier and Congressman from Texas, 1869–1872
 William Walter Clark (1885–1971), American politician from Wisconsin
 William White Clark (1819–1883), Confederate politician

Canada
 William George Clark (politician) (1865–1948), Canadian politician
 William Harold Clark (1869–1913), Canadian politician in Alberta
 William Mortimer Clark (1836–1915), Canadian politician
 Keir Clark (William Keir Clark; 1910–2010), Canadian merchant and political figure in Prince Edward Island

U.K.
 William Clark, Baron Clark of Kempston (1917–2004), British politician
 William Henry Clark (1876–1952), British civil servant and diplomat
 William Moore Wallis Clark (1897–1971), Ulster Unionist member of the Senate of Northern Ireland

Religion
 William Clark (priest) (died 1603), English Roman Catholic priest and conspirator
 William Clark (bishop) (died 1925), Canadian Anglican bishop
 William Hawley Clark (1919–1997), bishop of the Episcopal Diocese of Delaware
 William Robinson Clark (1829–1912), Canadian theologian
 William Clark (Anglican), Massachusetts cleric

Science
 William Andrew Clark (1911–1983), British botanist
 William Bullock Clark (1860–1917), American geologist
 William Inglis Clark (1855–1932), Scottish pharmaceutical chemist
 William J. Clark, Scottish orthodontist

Sports

Football and rugby
 Bill Clark (American football) (born 1968), retired college football coach
 Bill Clark (Australian footballer) (1922–2015), Australian rules footballer
 Bill Clark (rugby union) (1929–2010), New Zealand rugby player
 Billy Clark (footballer, born 1881) (1881–1937), Scottish football player
 Billy Clark (footballer, born 1967), English football player
 Billy Clark (footballer, born 1991), English football player
 William Clark (football manager), Scottish football manager
 William Dennison Clark (1885–1932), American football player
 William Clarke (footballer, fl. 1897–1900), football player for Lincoln City and Aberdeen F.C.
 Willie Clarke (footballer) (1878–1940), born William Clark, Scottish football player for Aston Villa, Bradford and Bristol Rovers

Other sports
 William Clark (archer) (1842–1913), American Olympic archer
 William Clark (boxer) (1899–1988), American boxer who competed in the 1920 Summer Olympics
 William Clark (skier) (1910–1975), Canadian skier and Olympic competitor
 Will Clark (William Nuschler Clark, Jr., born 1964), American professional baseball player
 Bill Clark (basketball) (born 1988), American basketball player

Professors
 William Clark (anatomist) (1788–1869), Professor of Anatomy at Cambridge University
 William George Clark (1821–1878), British scholar of Shakespearean literature
 William S. Clark (1826–1886), American agricultural scientist and educator at University of Massachusetts
 William W. Clark (born 1940), professor of art history
 William C. Clark (born 1948), American ecologist and environmental policy analyst
 William A. V. Clark (born 1938), professor of geography
 William Mansfield Clark (1884–1964), American chemist

Other
 William Tierney Clark (1783–1852), English engineer and bridge designer
 William Clark (inventor) (1821–1880), British civil engineer and inventor
 William Nairne Clark (1804–1854), public notary and publisher in Australia
 William Ovens Clark (1849–1937), barrister and judge in British India
 William Clark (judge) (1891–1957), American federal judge

See also
 William Clarke (disambiguation)
 William Clark Jr. (disambiguation)
 William H. Clark (disambiguation)
 Will Clark (disambiguation)
 Willie Clark (disambiguation)
 William Clerk (disambiguation)